Black sagebrush is a common name for several flowering plants native to the western United States and may refer to:

Artemisia arbuscula
Artemisia nova